James Munting (born 28 September 1986) is an Australian cricketer. He played in one first-class match for South Australia in 2013.

See also
 List of South Australian representative cricketers

References

External links
 

1986 births
Living people
Australian cricketers
South Australia cricketers
Cricketers from Adelaide